Downingia cuspidata is a species of flowering plant in the bellflower family known by the common name toothed calicoflower. This showy wildflower is native to California, where it is a resident of ponds, meadows, and vernal pool ecosystems throughout the state. Its range may extend into Mexico.

This annual grows on a branching erect stem with small leaves at intervals. At the top of each stem branch is one or more flowers, each about a centimeter wide. The tubular flower has two long, narrow, pointed upper lobes which may be blue or purple to nearly white. The lower lip is fused into one three-lobed surface, which is blue, purple, or white with a large blotch or two smaller blotches of yellow in the center, outlined in white. Each lobe may have a toothlike point.

External links
Jepson Manual Treatment
USDA Plants Profile
Photo gallery

cuspidata
Flora of California
Flora without expected TNC conservation status